The 2021 Portland Timbers season was the club's 35th season of existence and the 11th season for the Portland Timbers in Major League Soccer (MLS), the top-flight professional soccer league in the United States and Canada. The season covers the period from the end of the Timber's last match in MLS or MLS Playoffs in 2020 (November 22, 2020) to their final match in MLS Cup Plays on December 11, 2021.

Background 

The 2020 season was heavily altered due to the onset of the COVID-19 pandemic. Portland played its first two matches as scheduled, before the season was suspended on March 12, 2020. The season resumed with a bubble tournament near Orlando, Florida, dubbed the MLS is Back Tournament, which began on July 13, 2020 and concluded on August 11, 2020. Portland defeated Orlando City SC in the championship, and earned a berth into the 2021 CONCACAF Champions League for winning the tournament.

The league resumed, with Portland playing their remaining matches behind closed doors. The number of regular season matches from 2020 decreased from 34 to 23 due to the pandemic. Ultimately Portland finished with an 11–6–6 regular season record, and earned a berth into the 2020 MLS Cup Playoffs. Portland was defeated by FC Dallas in the opening round. Diego Valeri lead the team in MLS goals with six total, and Jeremy Ebobisse lead Portland in goals across all competitions with eight.

Season review 
The season was postponed from the normal late February 27–28 starting weekend and instead began on the weekend of April 16–18 due to the pandemic. Ahead of the start of the regular season, Portland began competitive fixtures in the Champions League on April 6, 2021.

Non-competitive

Preseason friendlies

Midseason friendlies

Competitive

Major League Soccer

Standings 
Western Conference

Overall

Matches

MLS Cup Playoffs

MLS Cup

U.S. Open Cup

CONCACAF Champions League

Round of 16

Quarter-finals

Statistics

Appearances and discipline
Numbers in parentheses denote appearances as a substitute.

(T2) = Players called up from Portland Timbers 2 for short-term contracts.

Goalkeeper stats
The list is sorted by total minutes played then by jersey number.

Top assists
The list is sorted by shirt number when total assists are equal.

Shutouts
The list is sorted by shirt number when total clean sheets are equal.

Summary

Top scorers
The list is sorted by shirt number when total goals are equal.

References

Portland Timbers (MLS) seasons
Portland
Portland Timbers
Portland Timbers
Portland Timbers
Portland